The James P. Newton House and Maid Cottage are historic buildings located in Sioux City, Iowa, United States.  Newton was a prominent local businessman associated with Haskins Bros. & Co., whose principal product was soap.  He was a traveling salesman with the company before he and his brothers bought the company in 1907.  He succeeded his brother William as president in 1929.  Newton had prominent Sioux City architect William L. Steele design this house, and it is one of his earliest works in the city.  The 1½-story frame American Craftsman house and the single-story frame maid's house near the alley feature clapboard siding, porches with square columns, and low pitched hipped roofs with dormers.  The bands of color and the wide eaves are elements from the Prairie School style for which Steele would become well known.  The two houses were listed together on the National Register of Historic Places in 2000.

References

Houses completed in 1909
Bungalow architecture in Iowa
Houses in Sioux City, Iowa
Houses on the National Register of Historic Places in Iowa
National Register of Historic Places in Sioux City, Iowa
American Craftsman architecture in Iowa
William L. Steele buildings
1909 establishments in Iowa